Alice Marie-Claude Caffarel-Cayron (born 30 June 1961) is a French-Australian linguist. She is an Honorary Senior Lecturer in Linguistics at the University of Sydney. Caffarel is recognized for the development of a Systemic Functional Grammar of French which has been applied in the teaching of the French language, Discourse analysis and Stylistics at the University of Sydney. Caffarel is recognised as an expert in the field of French Systemic Functional Linguistics (SFL).

Biography
Caffarel was born in Bordeaux, France in 1961 and moved to Australia in 1983. She began her undergraduate studies in Linguistics at the University of Sydney in 1987 and graduated in 1991 with First Class Honours. Her Honours thesis research on the semantics of French tense was published in 1992. She went on to complete a PhD in Linguistics at the University of Sydney in 1996. Her PhD thesis was a prolegomena to a Systemic Functional grammar of French. Her first academic appointment was at the University of Sydney in 1996 as Associate Lecturer which was then was converted into a tenured full-time lecturing position in 1998.

In 1996 and 1999 Caffarel co-organized the first and second Systemic Functional Typology/Topology Workshops with Professor J.R. Martin. Papers from these workshops were compiled into a volume (published December 2004) which she co-edited with J.R. Martin and C.M.I.M. Matthiessen (Department of Linguistics, Macquarie University). In 2003, Caffarel was awarded a Faculty of Arts Teaching Excellence Award at the University of Sydney. Since joining the French Studies Department in 1996, Caffarel has expanded the linguistic curriculum and taught a number of linguistic units on language development, language teaching methodology, functional grammar, discourse analysis, ideology in news, and stylistics. She became Chair of the French Studies Department at the University of Sydney in 2009 until mid-2011.

In addition to her work in expanding the linguistic curriculum in the Department of French Studies, Caffarel has published a number of books and book chapters on French grammar. One of her latest works is a book chapter, The Verbal Group in French, in The Routledge Handbook of Systemic Functional Linguistics.

Contributions to linguistics
Caffarel has made major contributions to the development of a Systemic Functional Language theory of the French language. Her work on developing a Systemic Functional Grammar of French is unique as "it is discourse-based and provides an interpretation of grammar which reflects how French speakers/writers make meaning in various contexts of use". M.A.K. Halliday, in the foreword to her 2006 monograph, described her contribution to theory in the following way:  The consistent interplay between theoretical and applied pursuits has always been a defining feature of systemic functional theory, where no clear line is drawn between application and theory and each is a source of positive input to the other. This kind of mutual enrichment is clearly demonstrated in Alice Caffarel's work. The result is a description that penetrates the heart of the language, revealing it at one and the same time as a specimen of the human semiotic and a unique resource for the continuous creation of meaning. (Halliday, 2006: i)Her work has been used as an instrumental resource in the discourse analysis and interpretation of French texts, and as a model for developing descriptions of other languages from a Systemic Functional perspective.

In addition to her ongoing description of French as a tool for the analysis of meaning, from 2005 to 2010, Caffarel also worked with a number of Systemic Functional Linguistics researchers from universities around Australia on an international news project which analyzed the coverage of news on the Middle East in various languages, looking at ideology and text structure.

Caffarel's current work focuses on developing the first comprehensive account of the language of the influential French writer and philosopher Simone de Beauvoir. This project aims to elucidate Beauvoir's use of language as a mode of action and tool for change by analyzing recurrent linguistic choices that are significant to her philosophy and to the communicative force of her writings. It explores the aspects of Beauvoir's language that, on the one hand, contribute to a particular vision of the world that promotes freedom and change, and, on the other hand, extend agency and transcendence to her readers.

Selected publications
 Caffarel-Cayron, A. (2018). Simone de Beauvoir's construal of language and literature in Mémoires d’une jeune fille rangée (1958): A Hasanian perspective. In Wegener, Oesterle, Neumann (Eds.),  On Verbal Art: essays in honour of Ruqaiya Hasan, (pp. 132–165).Sheffield and Bristol: Equinox.
 Caffarel-Cayron, A. (2017). The Verbal Group in French. In Tom Bartlett and Gerard O’Grady (Eds.), The Routledge Handbook of Systemic Functional Linguistics, (pp. 319–337). London and New York: Routledge.
 Caffarel-Cayron, A. (2016). Beauvoir and the Agency of Writing. In David Banks and Janet Ormrod (Eds.), Nouvelles études sur la transitivité en francais: Une perspective systémique fonctionnelle, (pp. 57–80). Paris: L'Harmattan.
 Caffarel-Cayron, A., Rechniewski, E. (2014). Exploring the generic structure of French editorials from the perspective of systemic functional linguistics. Journal of World Languages, 1(1), 18-37.
 Caffarel-Cayron, A. (2010). Systemic functional grammar and the study of meaning. In Heiko Narrog, Bernd Heine (Eds.), The Oxford Handbook of Linguistic Analysis, (pp. 797–825). Oxford: Oxford University Press.
 Caffarel, A., Rechniewski, E. (2009). A systemic functional approach to analyzing and interpreting ideology: an illustration from French editorials. Revista Alicantina de Estudios Ingleses, 22, 27-43  
 Caffarel, A., Rechniewski, E. (2008). When is a Handover not a Handover? A case study of the ideologically opposed French news stories. In Thompson, Elizabeth A. and White, P.R.R. (Eds.), Communicating Conflict: Multilingual Case Studies of the News Media, (pp. 25–49). London and New York: Continuum.
 Caffarel, A. 2006/2008. A Systemic Functional Grammar of French: From grammar to discourse. London: Continuum.
 Caffarel, A. 2006. Learning Advanced French through SFL; Learning SFL in French. in Byrnes, H. (ed.), Advanced Language Learning: The Contribution of Halliday and Vygotsky, (pp204–224). London: Continuum.
 Caffarel, A., Martin, J., Matthiessen, C. (2004). Language Typology: A functional perspective. Amsterdam: John Benjamins Publishing Company.
 Caffarel, A. (2004). The construal of a second-order semiosis in Camus’ L'Étranger. In D. Banks (ed.). Text and Texture: Systemic functional viewpoints on the nature and structure of text, (pp 537–570). Paris: L’Harmattan.
 Caffarel, A. (1992). Interacting between a generalized tense semantics and register-specific semantic tense systems: a bi-stratal exploration of the semantics of French tense. Language Sciences 14.4. pp 385–418.

References 

1961 births
Living people
Linguists from Australia
Linguists from France
Women linguists
University of Sydney alumni
Academic staff of the University of Sydney